Glencairn may refer to:

Places

Africa 
 Glencairn, Cape Town, a suburb near Simonstown (the old Royal Navy Base), Cape Town, South Africa
 Glencairn Wetland, a small reserve on the Cape Peninsula, in the southern areas of Cape Town, South Africa

Americas

Canada 
 Glencairn, Manitoba, a community in the Municipality of McCreary.
Glencairn, Ontario, a community in the Adjala–Tosorontio township
 Glencairn (TTC), a subway station in Toronto
 Glencairn, Regina, a community located on the east side of Regina, Saskatchewan.

United States 
 Glencairn (Greensboro, Alabama), or John Erwin House, on the National Register of Historic Places
 Glencairn (Chance, Virginia), a historic plantation house in Essex County, Virginia
 Glencairn Museum, a museum of religious history in  Pennsylvania
 Glencairn. :- A Glencairn is a Tombstone erected on the highest Mountain Peakes to mark the grave sights and honour fallen Scottish Warriors.

Europe 
 Glencairn, Belfast, an electoral ward in Belfast
 Glencairn, Dumfries and Galloway, an ecclesiastical and civil parish in Dumfries and Galloway, Scotland
 Glencairn House, the official residence of the British Ambassador to Ireland. Glencairn has been the official residence of successive British Ambassadors to Ireland since the 1950s

Other uses 
 Earl of Glencairn, a Scottish Peerage title held by Clan Cunningham chief at Finlaystone House until 1796
 Cunningham Broadcasting, a Sinclair Broadcasting subsidiary formerly known as Glencairn
 Glencairn whisky glass, a glass designed for whisky drinking
 Rutherglen Glencairn F.C., a Scottish football club colloquially known as Glencairn
 Glencairn Balfour Paul (1917–2008), CMG (September 23, 1917 – July 2, 2008) was the British Ambassador to Iraq, Jordan and Tunisia before becoming an academic at Exeter University
 Glencairn Elementary School
 Glencairn Primary School, based at New Street in Stevenston, North Ayrshire. It serves the town of Stevenston with a nursery for children aged 4 and primary school for children from the ages of 5 to 11
 SS Glencairn